Pygoda amianta is a species of stink bug in the family Pentatomidae. It was first described in 2018 and is found in Costa Rica and Panamá. Its scientific name is in reference to the pure green color of the pronotum, scutellum and connexivum, without brown punctures or stains (Gr. Amiantos—pure, unspotted).

References

Pentatomidae
Insects described in 2018